Kim Sang-ho (born October 5, 1964) is a former South Korean football player and coach.

He started his career with POSCO Atoms since 1987. To 1994, he played 149 league games and scored 10 goals. In 1988, he was one of K-League Best XI. From 1995, he moved to newly formed Chunnam Dragons, In Chunnam, he played 66 league games and scored 3 goals.

After retirement, he became a football coach. He went to England, obtained FA coaching "B" licence in 1998, also took training at Wimbledon.

Back to South Korea, he coached several team for years.

Honors

Club

POSCO Atoms
 K-League champions : 1988, 1992
 K-League runner-up : 1987
 K-League Cup champion : 1993

Chunnam Dragons
 K-League runner-up : 1997
 Korean FA Cup champion : 1997
 K-League Cup runner-up : 1997

Individual
 K-League Best XI : 1988 (MF)
 K-League All-Star Game : 1991

Club career statistics

International goals
Results list South Korea's goal tally first.

References

External links
 
 
 

1964 births
Living people
Association football midfielders
South Korean footballers
Pohang Steelers players
Jeonnam Dragons players
K League 1 players
South Korean football managers
Gangwon FC managers
Shanghai Shenxin F.C. managers
China League One managers
Expatriate football managers in China
Asian Games medalists in football
Footballers at the 1990 Asian Games
Asian Games bronze medalists for South Korea
Medalists at the 1990 Asian Games
South Korea international footballers